Akbarabad (also Romanized as Akbarābād) is a village in Halil Rural District, in the Central District of Jiroft County, Kerman Province, Iran. At the 2006 census, its population was 450, in 108 families.

References 

Populated places in Jiroft County